Kreamer Island is a small island in the south-easternmost part of Lake Okeechobee, located in Palm Beach County, Florida just north of Torry Island.  

Kreamer Island is accessible only by airboat during the wet season and by recreational vehicles during dry season/droughts. A small canal separates Kreamer Island and Torry Island.

Kreamer Island was a settlement in Palm Beach County, Florida. The island was first settled in the 19th century as a fishing and agricultural settlement. Kreamer Island suffered numerous casualties over the years from hurricanes, including one in the 1920s, in which about 1000 people around the lake perished. The area became generally flooded after the dike around the lake was raised from 6 feet to 20 feet. Kreamer Island is now considered a ghost town.

In the beginning of the 2007 winter the Palm Beach County Board of Commissioners started an archaeological dig on Kreamer Island after drought conditions revealed artifacts on the bottom of Lake Okeechobee.

References

Lake islands of Florida
Islands of Palm Beach County, Florida
Lake Okeechobee
Ghost towns in Florida
Former populated places in Palm Beach County, Florida
Islands of Florida